Petersburg Mountain is a mountain located in the Catskill Mountains of New York southeast of Cobleskill. Warnerville Hill is located northwest, and Donats Mountain is located northwest of Petersburg Mountain. In 1940, a  steel fire lookout tower was built on the mountain. The tower was closed at the end of the 1971 season, and later transferred to Schoharie County for use as a radio tower. The tower site is closed to the public.

History
In 1940, the Civilian Conservation Corps built a  International Derrick tower on the mountain. The tower was first staffed in 1941, reporting 7 fire and 223 visitors. Due to increased use of aerial detection for fire watching, the tower was closed at the end of the 1971 season. The tower was later transferred to Schoharie County for use as a radio tower. The county removed the cab and added  to the tower to make room for more antennas. The tower was later removed and replaced with an antenna support structure. The fire lookout tower was sold to Barry Knight, who relocated it to his property in West Hurley.

References

Mountains of New York (state)
Mountains of Schoharie County, New York